The Motor Company of Botswana (Pty.) Ltd. was joint venture of the Hyundai Motor Company with its local dealership Hyundai Motor Distributors (Pty.) Ltd. The company was founded in 1992 with its headquarters in Gaborone, Botswana. In February 1993 they began the assembly of Hyundai CKD kits until closing in 2001.

The company was co-founded by Billy Rautenbach, a wealthy businessman from Zimbabwe that also owned Wheels of Africa, a large cargo trucking enterprise. Hyundai, however, only delivered the CKD kits, from which Hyundai models were made. At times, finished vehicles were imported from Mozambique, disassembled, reassembled and exported to South Africa in order to - compared to the direct import to South Africa - gain significant tax advantages.

In 2000, the company - along with the Swedish Motor Corporation at the same location - went bankrupt with high debts.

Model overview

External links
Hyundai plant revving up to make new inroads in SA
SOUTH AFRICA: Job losses follow Hyundai liquidation
Hyundai write-off hurts clients
"Africa South of the Sahara 2004" Chapter: "Manufacturing and Construction" (page 97); 
Botswana car plant goes cheap

References 

Car manufacturers of Botswana
Vehicle manufacturing companies established in 1992
Botswana companies